Odessa  is a city in and the county seat of Ector County, Texas, United States. It is located primarily in Ector County, although a small section of the city extends into Midland County.

Odessa's population was 114,428 at the 2020 census, making it the 28th-most populous city in Texas; it is the principal city of the Odessa metropolitan statistical area, which includes all of Ector County. The metropolitan area is also a component of the larger Midland–Odessa combined statistical area, which had a 2010 census population of 278,801; a report from the United States Census Bureau estimated that the combined population as of July 2015 is 320,513.

In 1948 Odessa was also the home of First Lady Barbara Bush, and the onetime home of former Presidents George H. W. Bush and George W. Bush. Former President George H. W. Bush has been quoted as saying "At Odessa we became Texans and proud of it."

Etymology
Odessa is said to have been named after Odesa, Ukraine, because of the local shortgrass prairie's resemblance to Ukraine's steppe landscape.

History

Odessa was founded in 1881 as a water stop and cattle-shipping point on the Texas and Pacific Railway. The first post office opened in 1885. Odessa became the county seat of Ector County in 1891 when the county was first organized. It was incorporated as a city in 1927, after oil was discovered in Ector County on the Connell Ranch southwest of Odessa.

With the opening of the Penn Field in 1929, and the Cowden Field in 1930, oil became a major draw for new residents. In 1925, the population was just 750; by 1929, it had risen to 5,000. For the rest of the 20th century, the city's population and economy grew rapidly during each of a succession of oil booms (roughly in the 1930s–1950s, 1970s, and 2010s), often with accompanying contractions during the succeeding busts (particularly in the 1960s and 1980s).

Geography
Odessa is located along the southwestern edge of the Llano Estacado in West Texas. It is situated above the Permian Basin, a large sedimentary deposit that contains significant reserves of oil and natural gas.

Climate
Odessa has the semiarid climate typical of West Texas. Summers are hot and sunny, while winters are mild and dry. Most rainfall occurs in late spring and summer; snowfall is rare. The area exhibits a large diurnal temperature range and frequent high winds.

Demographics

As of the 2020 United States census, there were 114,428 people, 41,942 households, and 28,218 families residing in the city. As of the 2010 census, 99,940 people, 35,216 households, and 27,412 families resided in the city. The population density was 2,276.5 people per square mile (954.2/km). There were 43,687 housing units at an average density of 995.1 per square mile (384.2/km).

In 2010, the racial makeup of the city was 75.4% White, 5.7% Black, 1.1% Asian, 1.0% Native American, 0.1% Pacific Islander, 14.2% from other races, and 2.5% from two or more races. Hispanic or Latino residents of any race was 50.6%. By 2020, the racial and ethnic makeup was 32.68% non-Hispanic white, 6.12% African American, 0.37% Native American, 2.14% Asian, 0.23% Pacific Islander, 0.31% some other race, 2.01% multiracial, and 56.14% Hispanic or Latino of any race, reflecting state and nationwide trends of greater diversification.

Of the 35,216 households in 2010,  37.9% had children under the age of 18 living with them, 51.6% were married couples living together, 14.5% had a female householder with no husband present, and 29.6% were not families.  About 25.7% of all households were made up of individuals, and 9.6% had someone living alone who was 65 years of age or older. The average household size was 2.65, and the average family size was 3.21. The population was distributed as 29.8% under the age of 18, 10.6% from 18 to 24, 27.8% from 25 to 44, 20.0% from 45 to 64, and 11.8% who were 65 years of age or older. The median age was 32 years. For every 100 females, there were 93.2 males. For every 100 females age 18 and over, there were 88.6 males.

At the 2000 census, the median income for a household in the city was $31,209, and the median income for a family was $36,869. Males had a median income of $31,115 versus $21,743 for females. The per capita income for the city was $16,096. About 16.0% of families and 18.6% of the population were below the poverty line, including 23.9% of those under age 18 and 14.1% of those age 65 or over. The 2020 American community Survey estimated the median household income increased to $63,829 with a mean income of $82,699.

Economy

Historically, the Odessa economy has been primarily driven by the area's oil industry, booming and busting in response to rises and falls in the crude oil price. Many of the city's largest employers are oilfield supply companies and petrochemical processing companies. In recent decades, city leaders have begun trying to decrease the city's reliance on the energy industry to moderate the boom-bust cycle and develop greater economic sustainability.

Odessa has also taken steps to diversify the energy it produces. In 2009, a wind farm has been constructed in northern Ector County. Around the same time, a coal pollution mitigation plant had been announced for a site previously entered in the Futuregen bidding. The plant will be run by Summit Power and will be located near Penwell. This plant was supposed to lead to the creation of 8,000 jobs in the area. Plans were also in place for a small nuclear reactor called the High-Temperature Teaching and Test Reactor to be run as a test and teaching facility in conjunction with the nuclear engineering department at University of Texas of the Permian Basin.

Odessa's main enclosed shopping mall is Music City Mall, which includes Dillards, JC Penney, At Home, Burlington Coat Factory, an indoor skating rink, and CBS affiliate KOSA-TV. Construction of new retail in recent years has been concentrated on the city's northeast side. In November 2007, the city approved a contract with a company that develops armaments for US Army helicopters to begin operations in Odessa.

Largest employers

As in many municipalities, some of the largest employers are in the education, government, and healthcare industries. Outside of those areas, the city's major employers are concentrated in the oil industry. According to the city's 2021 Comprehensive Annual Financial Report, the top employers in the city were:

Arts and culture

Performing arts
The Midland–Odessa Symphony and Chorale (MOSC) was founded in 1962, and is the region's largest orchestral organization, presenting both Pops and Masterworks concerts throughout the year. Composed of professional musicians from the area, as well as Lubbock, San Angelo, and other surrounding cities, the MOSC is also home to three resident chamber ensembles: the Lone Star Brass, Permian Basin String Quartet, and West Texas Winds. These ensembles are made up of principal musicians in the orchestra, who come to the area from across the United States.

The Globe of the Great Southwest, located on the campus of Odessa College, the community college in Odessa, features an authentic replica of William Shakespeare's Globe Theatre. It hosts plays and other community groups throughout the year, as well as an annual Shakespeare festival.

Built in 1951, the Ector Theater served as one Odessa's finest theaters until it closed. Today, the renovated 700-seat theater provides the community with classic movies, live theatrical productions, and concerts. The theater is now part of the Marriott Hotel and Conference Center which is scheduled to open in August 2019.

The Permian Playhouse has provided music, dance, drama, suspense, and comedy for over 40 years.

Sports

The Odessa Jackalopes junior A ice hockey team plays its home games at Ector County Coliseum. High-school football is also popular. Ratliff Stadium, which was featured in the movie Friday Night Lights, is home to the Odessa Bronchos and the Permian Panthers. It is one of the largest high-school stadiums in the state, listed as seventh in capacity within Texas.

Tourism

Odessa's Presidential Museum and Leadership Library, on the campus of the University of Texas of the Permian Basin, is the only facility of its kind in the United States—dedicated to the office of the Presidency, not any particular occupant of the Oval Office. It also has displays about the presidents of the Republic of Texas.

After fighting financial hardships, the Presidential Museum closed its doors to the public as of 21 August 2009. In February 2010, additional funding allowed the doors to reopen, with negotiations pending for the University of Texas of the Permian Basin to take control of the museum.

Texon Santa Fe Depot, recently relocated to West Odessa, serves as a museum in honor of the old west and the railroads.

The Parker House Museum is Odessa's newest addition to the historical records of Odessa. It represents the lifestyle of a prominent ranching family, who served the communities of Andrews and Ector Counties since 1907.

Odessa Meteor Crater, an impact crater  in diameter, is located southwest of the city.

Government

Local government
Odessa has a council–manager government, with a city council of five councillors (elected from geographic districts) and a mayor (elected at-large). The council appoints and directs other city officials, including the city manager, and sets the city's budget, taxes, and other policies.

In the 2014 fiscal year, the Odessa government had $179.1 million in revenues, $146.3 million in expenditures, $454 million in total assets, and $203 million in total liabilities. The city's major sources of public revenues were fees for services (such as public utilities), sales taxes, and property taxes, and its major expenses were for public safety and for water and sewer service.

On December 14, 2022, the Odessa City Council voted to make Odessa a "sanctuary city for the unborn." In a 6-1 vote, Mayor Javier Joven and council members Denise Swanner, Mark Matta, Gilbert Vasquez, Chris Hanie, and Greg Connell established Odessa as the 62nd city to "outlaw" abortion. The new city ordinance makes a person civilly liable if any person aids, abets, or assists anybody in an abortion operation.

State representation
The Texas Department of Criminal Justice operates the Odessa District Parole Office in Odessa.

Federal representation
The United States Postal Service operates three post offices in Odessa: Odessa, Northeast Odessa, and West Odessa.

Education

Universities and colleges

University of Texas Permian Basin

The University of Texas Permian Basin (UTPB) began in 1973. UTPB was an upper level and graduate university until the Texas Legislature passed a bill in spring 1991 to allow the university to accept freshmen and sophomores.  As of 2006, the university was holding discussions with the Nuclear Regulatory Commission about the construction of a new High-Temperature Teaching and Test Reactor, which if successful, would finish licensing and construction around 2012. It would be the first university-based research reactor to be built in the US in roughly a decade, and be one of the few HTGR-type reactors in the world. In January 2006, UTPB's School of Business was awarded accreditation by the Association to Advance Collegiate Schools of Business International, which is generally regarded as the premier accreditation agency for the world's business schools. According to the university, only 30% of business schools in the United States, and 15% of world business schools, have received AACSB accreditation.

Texas Tech University Health Sciences Center

Texas Tech University Health Sciences Center Permian Basin Campus opened as a school of medicine in 1979, beginning in the basement of Medical Center Hospital. Since 1994, TTUHSC Permian Basin has included a school of allied health, offering a master's degree in physical therapy. Also, on the campus of Midland College, it offers a physician-assistant program. Additionally, TTUHSC Permian Basin includes a school of nursing focusing on primary care and rural health. In June 1999, the Texas Tech Health Center opened as a clinic, providing increased access to primary and specialized health care for the Permian Basin. Texas Tech University Health Sciences Center Permian Basin also operates 21 WIC clinics located in nearby small communities.

Community colleges

Odessa College is a public, two-year college based in Odessa, serving the people of Ector County and the Permian Basin. It opened in 1952 and currently enrolls about 6,000 annually in its university-parallel and occupational/technical courses, and 11,000 students annually in its basic education, continuing education, and community recreation courses.

Odessa College serves most of Midland, as in the parts in Ector County. Parts in Midland County are assigned to Midland College.

Primary and secondary schools
The Ector County Independent School District serves portions of Odessa in Ector County (the vast majority of the city). ECISD was established in 1921, in a consolidation of seven area schools. The district now contains 38 campuses. It administers these high schools: Permian High School, Odessa High School, George H. W. Bush New Tech Odessa, OC Techs at Odessa College and Odessa Collegiate Academy, also at Odessa College.

The portion of Odessa in Midland County is zoned to the Midland Independent School District.

Odessa's private schools include Montessori Mastery School of Odessa, Latter Rain Christian School, Odessa Christian School, Permian Basin Christian School, Faith Community Christian Academy, St. John's Episcopal School, St. Mary's Central Catholic School (of the Roman Catholic Diocese of San Angelo, Rainey School of Montessori, Sherwood Christian Academy, and Zion Christian Academy. Odessa is also home to five charter schools: Compass Academy Charter School, UTPB STEM Academy, Harmony Science Academy-Odessa, Embassy Academy, and Richard Milburn Academy-Odessa.

Libraries

Ector County Library
Murry H. Fly Learning Resource Center
The J. Conrad Dunagan Library

Media

The city's main daily newspaper is the Odessa American.

Radio

Television

 KMID (ABC)
 KOSA-TV (CBS)
 KOSA-DTV2 (MyTV)
 KWES-TV (NBC)
 KWES-DTV2 (The CW)
 KWES-DTV3/KTLE-LD (Telemundo)
 KUPB (Univision)
 KUPB-DTV2 (LATV)
 KPEJ-TV (Fox)
 KPEJ-DTV2 (Estrella TV)
 KWWT (MeTV)
 KWWT-DTV2 (Movies!)
 KWWT-DTV3 (Antenna TV)
 KWWT-DTV4 (This TV)
 KPBT-TV (PBS)
 KPBT-DTV2 (PBS Kids)
 KMLM-DT (God's Learning Channel)

Transportation

Air and space
 Odessa is served by Midland International Air and Space Port (ICAO code: KMAF, IATA code: MAF), which is located halfway between Odessa and Midland.
 Odessa-Schlemeyer Field (ICAO code: KODO, IATA code: ODO) is a general aviation airport located on Odessa's northeast side.

Midland International Airport is served by:
 American Airlines and American Eagle partner airlines
 Southwest Airlines
 United Airlines and United Express partner airlines

Midland Spaceport is not currently served by any commercial space companies.

Roads

Notable people

 Tommy Allsup, musician
 Karan Ashley, actress
 Raymond Benson, author
 Bonner Bolton, bull rider, model 
 Jim J. Bullock, actor
 Lucius Desha Bunton III, United States federal judge
 Marcus Cannon, professional football player
 Chuck Dicus, player in College Football Hall of Fame
 Hayden Fry, college football coach
 Ronald D. Godard, ambassador 
 Britt Harley Hager, professional football player
 Daniel Ray Herrera, professional baseball pitcher
 Mike Holloway, winner of Survivor: Worlds Apart
 Daryl Hunt, professional football player
 Virgil Johnson, founder of The Velvets singing group
 Chris Kyle, former U.S. Navy SEAL
 Brooks Landgraf, attorney and member of the Texas House of Representatives from District 81
 Blair Late, singer and actor
 Trey Lunsford, former catcher for the San Francisco Giants
 Bradley Marquez, former NFL wide receiver
 Nolan McCarty, Chair Department of Politics, Princeton University
 Chris McGaha, NHRA Pro Stock racer
 Gene Mayfield, college and high-school football coach
 Bill Myrick, country music singer
 Bill Noël, oil industrialist and philanthropist
 Roy Orbison, singer-songwriter 
 Robert Rummel-Hudson, author
 Kelly Schmedes, professional soccer player
 Wally Scott, famed glider pilot 
 Kim Smith, model and actress
 Toby Stevenson, Olympic pole vaulter
 Stephnie Weir, actress and comedian
 Elizabeth Wetmore, novelist
 Roy Williams, professional football player 
 Alfred Mac Wilson, United States Marine Corps Medal of Honor recipient
 Marvin Rex Young, U.S. Army Medal of Honor recipient

In popular culture
 The book Friday Night Lights: A Town, a Team, and a Dream, by author H. G. Bissinger, and the subsequent movie (Friday Night Lights), are based on the 1988 football season of Permian High School, one of the two high school football teams in Odessa.  
 Making News: Texas Style, a reality series on the TV Guide Channel, followed the reporters of the local CBS affiliate, KOSA-TV.
 A portion of the Tommy Lee Jones film The Three Burials of Melquiades Estrada was filmed in Odessa.
 The truTV reality show Black Gold is based on three oil wells outside of Odessa, as well as some locations in Odessa, such as the local Hooters restaurant.
The final episode of the third season of Twin Peaks included scenes which take place in Odessa.
Author Raymond Benson set portions of his novels The Black Stiletto and The Black Stiletto: Endings & Beginnings in Odessa. Several of his other novels and short stories use Odessa as a location but it is fictionalized as a town called "Limite, Texas."
Episodes of the sixth and seventh seasons of Legends of Tomorrow took place in Odessa.

See also
Odessa Flight Strip 
Midland–Odessa shootings

References

External links

 
 Odessa Convention and Visitors Bureau

 
Cities in Texas
Cities in Ector County, Texas
Cities in Midland County, Texas
County seats in Texas
1881 establishments in Texas
Populated places established in 1881
Cities in Midland–Odessa